Robert Arnold Seymour (June 13, 1916 – May 28, 1977) was an American football running back in the National Football League (NFL) for the Washington Redskins.  Seymour also played in the All-America Football Conference (AAFC) for the Los Angeles Dons.  He played college football at the University of Oklahoma and was selected in the tenth round of the 1940 NFL Draft.

External links
 
 

1916 births
1977 deaths
American football fullbacks
American football halfbacks
Denver Pioneers football coaches
Los Angeles Dons players
Oklahoma Sooners football players
Washington Redskins players
People from Commerce, Oklahoma
Players of American football from Oklahoma